Israel Pownoll (c.1710–1779) was an English shipbuilder for the Royal Navy.

History

In 1741, he was Foreman and Master Mastmaker of Deptford Dockyard. In March 1743 he was appointed Master Caulker.

In 1752 he moved to Portsmouth Dockyard as Assistant Shipwright but was only briefly there before moving to the same role at Chatham Dockyard. In May 1755 he became Master Shipwright at Sheerness and in December 1755 moved to Woolwich Dockyard and from then the Navy lists his works. In May 1772 he took over Plymouth Dockyard and in February 1775 became Master of the Navy's main yard at Chatham Dockyard.

He died at Chatham in April 1779. His will was read on 8 May and is now held at the National Archive at Kew.

Ships built
HMS Plymouth (1755) 8-gun yacht launched at Plymouth Dockyard
HMS Coventry (1757) launched at Chatham
HMS Princess Amelia (1757) 80-gun ship of the line launched at Woolwich
HMS Boreas (1757) 28-gun frigate launched at Woolwich
HMS Rippon (1758) 60-gun ship of the line launched at Woolwich
HMS Blenheim (1761) 90-gun ship of the line launched at Woolwich
HMS Defence (1763) 74-gun ship of the line launched at Plymouth Dockyard
HMS Boyne (1766) 70-gun Burford-class ship of the line, initially built by master shipwright Thomas Bucknall at Plymouth. Bucknall died in 1762 and was succeeded by Pownoll. 
HMS Swan (1767) 14-gun sloop launched at Plymouth with a figurehead
HMS Royal Oak (1769) 74-gun ship of the line launched at Plymouth
HMS Monmouth (1772) 64-gun ship of the line launched at Plymouth
HMS Conqueror (1773) 74-gun ship of the line launched at Plymouth
HMS Nonsuch (1774) 64-gun ship of the line launched at Plymouth
HMS Camilla (1775) 20-gun ship launched at Chatham
HMS Stirling Castle (1775) launched at Chatham
HMS Nymph (1778) 14-gun sloop launched at Chatham

Family
He was married to Mary Pownoll around 1732. He was father of Captain Philemon Pownoll.

References

1779 deaths
English shipbuilders
Year of birth uncertain